Casey Fitzgerald (born February 25, 1997) is an American professional ice hockey defenseman for the Florida Panthers of the National Hockey League (NHL). He was selected in the third round (86th overall) of the 2016 NHL Entry Draft by the Buffalo Sabres.

Playing career

Amateur
Fitzgerald was a part of the 2014–15 US national under-18 team of the United States Hockey League (USHL), where he won a gold medal and had the best plus/minus rating on the team at the 2015 IIHF World U18 Championships.

Collegiate
Fitzgerald joined the Boston College Eagles ice hockey team for the 2015–16 season. In his freshman year, he appeared in 39 games and scored 27 points, including 4 goals 23 assists. He was named to the Hockey East Pro Ambitions All-Rookie team at the conclusion of the 2015–16 season.

Professional
Fitzgerald was drafted in the third round (86th overall) in the 2016 NHL Entry Draft by the Buffalo Sabres. He made his NHL debut with the Sabres on December 17, 2021 and finished the game with an assist.

After being a healthy scratch for 6 straight games during the 2022–23 season, Fitzgerald was placed on waivers by the Sabres on January 10, 2023, upon the return of defenseman Henri Jokiharju from injury. He was subsequently claimed off waivers by the Florida Panthers on January 11.

Personal life
Fitzgerald's father, Tom played 17 seasons in the NHL. He won the Stanley Cup in 2009 while serving as an assistant coach with the Pittsburgh Penguins. , he serves as the general manager of the New Jersey Devils. Fitzergald's older brother Ryan was a teammate at Boston College. Ryan was drafted in fourth round (120th overall) by the Boston Bruins in the 2013 NHL Entry Draft.

Career statistics

Regular season and playoffs

International

References

External links
 
 Casey Fitzgerald profile at BC Athletics website

1997 births
Living people
American ice hockey players
Boston College Eagles men's ice hockey players
Buffalo Sabres draft picks
Buffalo Sabres players
Florida Panthers players
Ice hockey people from Massachusetts
People from North Reading, Massachusetts
Rochester Americans players
USA Hockey National Team Development Program players